Aetna (Ancient Greek: Αἴτνη Aἴtnē) was in Greek and Roman mythology a Sicilian nymph and, according to Alcimus, a daughter of Uranus and Gaia or of Briareus. Stephanus of Byzantium says that according to one account Aetna was a daughter of Oceanus. Simonides said that she had acted as arbitrator between Hephaestus and Demeter respecting the possession of Sicily. By Zeus or Hephaestus she became the mother of the Palici.  

Mount Etna in Sicily was believed to have derived its name from her and under it Zeus buried Typhon, Enceladus, or Briareus. The mountain itself was believed to be the place in which Hephaestus and the Cyclopes made the thunderbolts for Zeus.

Notes

References
Bell, Robert E., Women of Classical Mythology: A Biographical Dictionary. ABC-Clio. 1991. .
Euripides, Cyclops with an English translation by David Kovacs. Cambridge. Harvard University Press. Online version at the Perseus Digital Library. Greek text available from the same website.
Maurus Servius Honoratus, In Vergilii carmina comentarii. Servii Grammatici qui feruntur in Vergilii carmina commentarii; recensuerunt Georgius Thilo et Hermannus Hagen. Georgius Thilo. Leipzig. B. G. Teubner. 1881. Online version at the Perseus Digital Library.
Stephanus of Byzantium, Stephani Byzantii Ethnicorum quae supersunt, edited by August Meineike (1790-1870), published 1849. A few entries from this important ancient handbook of place names have been translated by Brady Kiesling. Online version at the Topos Text Project.

Further reading 
 Ellis, Robinson, Aetna, Clarendon Press, 1901. Internet Archive
 Meineke, August, Stephani Byzantii Ethnicorvm quae svpersvnt, Berolini: Impensis G. Reimeri, 1849. Internet Archive.
 Smith, William; Dictionary of Greek and Roman Biography and Mythology, London (1873). "Aetna"

Consorts of Hephaestus
Oceanids